The National Basketball Association (NBA) is a men's professional basketball league consisting of 30 teams in North America (29 in the United States and one in Canada). The NBA was founded on June 6, 1946, in New York City, as the Basketball Association of America (BAA). The league adopted its current name at the start of the  when it merged with the National Basketball League (NBL). The NBA is an active member of USA Basketball, which is recognized by the International Basketball Federation (FIBA) as the national governing body for basketball in the country. The league is considered to be one of the four major professional sports leagues of North America. 

The NBA operates on a franchise model in a closed system with no promotion or relegation to other leagues and no affiliated academies for amateur athletes.  The franchises are governed by their ownership and the NBA Board of Governors, allowing for franchises to change locations, team branding, mascots, staff, and player rosters.  During the NBA Draft, franchises select players who have not previously held a contract in the league and have declared themselves eligible.

In the early years of the league, a player's place on the roster was primarily determined by team ownership and management.  In 1970, Hall of Fame player and then-President of the NBA Players Association Oscar Robertson sued the league, putting in motion the establishment of Free Agency in 1976.  With player movement now having multiple decision makers and the constraints of the NBA salary cap, a player and franchise ownership would have to agree to a continuous relationship, taking into the account the player's impact, the team's performance goals, and the financial expectations from both sides, decreasing the likelihood a player would spend more than ten years with the same team 

The players listed have spent their entire NBA career, of at least 10 seasons played, with one franchise. Dirk Nowitzki holds the record, having played all of his 21 seasons with the Dallas Mavericks. Next is Kobe Bryant who played his entire 20-year career with the Los Angeles Lakers. Hall of Famer John Stockton spent his entire 19-year playing career with the Utah Jazz, while Tim Duncan also played 19 years solely for the San Antonio Spurs, and Reggie Miller spent 18 NBA seasons with the Indiana Pacers.

Some notable players who were disqualified from this list include Karl Malone (who had previously spent 18 seasons with the Utah Jazz before signing with the Los Angeles Lakers in 2003), Hakeem Olajuwon (who had spent his first 17 seasons in the league playing for the Houston Rockets before being traded to the Toronto Raptors in 2001), Tony Parker (who played 17 seasons for the San Antonio Spurs before signing with the Charlotte Hornets in 2018), Michael Jordan who retired twice with the Chicago Bulls playing for 15 seasons before a brief comeback playing for the bench of the Washington Wizards (Had he not returned that last time he would qualify for the list) and Patrick Ewing (who played 15 seasons for the New York Knicks before being traded to the Seattle SuperSonics in 2000).

Udonis Haslem is the leader among active players, having played 20 seasons with the Miami Heat.

All-time list
Key

Note: This list is accurate through December 26, 2022

Future candidates

See also

 List of National Basketball Association seasons played leaders
 List of one-club men in association football
 List of one-club men in rugby league
 List of Major League Baseball players who spent their entire career with one franchise
 List of NHL players who spent their entire career with one franchise
 List of National Football League players who spent their entire career with one franchise

References
General

Specific

National Basketball Association lists
Basketball, NBA